Charles Alaimalo (born 14 June 1999 in New Zealand) is a New Zealand rugby union player.

Alaimalo represented  in the 2019,2020, 2021 and 2022 Mitre 10 Cups, scoring 4 tries in 30 appearances. In March 2021, he joined Italian side Zebre for the remainder of the 2020–21 Pro14 season and Pro14 Rainbow Cup.

He is the brother of  winger Solomon Alaimalo.

References

External links
It's Rugby Profile

1999 births
Zebre Parma players
Southland rugby union players
New Zealand rugby union players
Living people
Rugby union flankers